CyberStep, Inc. is a Japanese global online video game developer and publisher. The company was founded on April 1, 2000.

History 

CyberStep is a developer and publisher of online video games. Headquartered in Japan, CyberStep has local branches in the United States, Taiwan, Korea, the Netherlands and Indonesia. The company was founded on April 1, 2000.

CyberStep has developed seven online games: notably the third-person shooter Cosmic Break in 2008, the action MMORPG Onigiri in 2013, and Dawn of the Breakers in 2018.  In 2017, Cyberstep released its English language version of Toreba, where online players can pay to control crane games to win prizes.

Controversy 
CyberStep has developed a notorious reputation internationally by critics and players of its games for its gashapon-based monetisation model.

In 2020, Cyberstep faced lawsuits regarding employees tampering with machines to prevent wins in its online crane game, Toreba.

References

External links 

(United States) http://www.cyberstep.com/

Video game companies of Japan
Video game development companies
Video game publishers
Video game companies established in 2000
Japanese companies established in 2000
Suginami
Software companies based in Tokyo